The Baum School of Art is a non-profit community art school located in Allentown, Pennsylvania.

In 2016–2017, the school had a total enrollment of 3,346 students, 1,921 of which were children and teens, and 1,425 of which were adults. 178 classes were offered for children and teens, and 168 for adult students.

History

The school was established in the summer of 1926, when artist Walter Emerson Baum was recruited by Blanche Lucas to provide art instruction to art teachers of the Allentown School District.  Feedback was so positive that Baum was asked to return again and again.  The classes became known as "The Baum School."

Circulating Picture Club
Originally established in 1933 by Walter Emerson Baum, the Circulating Picture Club provides paintings for subscribers including banks, professional and business offices, government offices, and educational institutions.  The Circulating Picture Club has over 586 pictures in circulation by artists including Walter Emerson Baum, John E. Berninger, Mel Stark, Ann Yost Whitesell, and others.

Historical locations

See also
 List of historic places in Allentown, Pennsylvania

References

External links

1926 establishments in Pennsylvania
Art schools in Pennsylvania
Arts organizations established in 1926
Buildings and structures in Allentown, Pennsylvania
Culture of Allentown, Pennsylvania
Education in Allentown, Pennsylvania
Educational institutions established in 1926